Goniobranchus geminus, also known as the gem sea slug, is a species of very colourful sea slug, a dorid nudibranch, a marine gastropod mollusc in the family Chromodorididae.

Taxonomic history
Until 2012 this species was known as Chromodoris geminus but was moved to the genus Goniobranchus as a result of a molecular (DNA) study.

Description 
Goniobranchus geminus can reach a maximum size of 5 cm in length.
It has four distinctive coloured lines around the mantle edge. Starting from a thin white outer line, then a light grayish line, followed by another white line and finally a bright golden yellow line.
The background coloration from the back is light brown to yellowish speckled with mauve ocelli circled with a white margin.
The foot, clearer and with a white margin, also has ocelli.
The rhinophores are yellow or purple and laminated, gills are white outlined with beige.

Distribution and habitat
This sea slug lives in the Indian Ocean from Kenya to Sri Lanka and in the Red Sea and has a predilection for the external slopes of coral reefs.

Similar species
Goniobranchus kuniei (Pruvot-Fol, 1930).
Goniobranchus leopardus (Rudman, 1987).
Hypselodoris tryoni (Garrett, 1873).
Goniobranchus tritos (Yonow, 1994).

References

External links
 

Chromodorididae
Gastropods described in 1987